Debut is a video capture and screencast program from NCH Software, available for both Windows and Mac.

Debut integrates with other software developed by NCH Software such as VideoPad Video Editor and Movie Maker, Prism Video Converter and Express Burn CD and DVD Burner.

Interface
The UI for Debut is divided into 4 major elements.
 Main Toolbar consists of options to select the capture method, schedule a recording, find and play recordings, and the ability to configure settings such as frame rate, hot-keys, output destination and format, etc.
 Recording Controls consists of options such as record, pause, stop, sound output, snapshot, and the selection window that highlights the area marked for recording such as full screen, a selected area on the screen, etc.
 Record As Section allows the user to configure the output format, encoder options, video options, and the ability to add text captions, video effects, watermark, and select the area of the screen for recording.
 Preview Area is very large and displays the preview of what is being recorded.

Input types
Debut can record video from an external recording device, computer screen, webcam, and streaming video. Debut combines two applications – screen recording and video capture from webcams and external inputs.

Controversy and criticism
NCH Software in the past had an option to download Ask and Chrome Toolbars when downloading any of their applications. These download options were checked by default, and generated malware warnings from companies like McAfee and Norton. NCH software unbundled these toolbars in July 2015, and are now certified safe by anti-virus companies like Norton and McAfee.

A class-action lawsuit was filed against NCH Software in April 2016 relating to security vulnerabilities in the 2015 version of the program. The case was later dismissed.

See also
Comparison of screencasting software

References

External links
 Debut Video Capture Official Site

Screencasting software
Screenshot software
Windows multimedia software
MacOS software
Proprietary software